Luísa Parente Ribeiro de Carvalho (born 1 February 1973) is a Brazilian gymnast. She competed at the 1988 Summer Olympics and the 1992 Summer Olympics.

References

External links
 

1973 births
Living people
Brazilian female artistic gymnasts
Gymnasts at the 1988 Summer Olympics
Gymnasts at the 1992 Summer Olympics
Olympic gymnasts of Brazil
Pan American Games bronze medalists for Brazil
Pan American Games gold medalists for Brazil
Pan American Games medalists in gymnastics
South American Games gold medalists for Brazil
South American Games medalists in gymnastics
South American Games silver medalists for Brazil
Competitors at the 1990 South American Games
Sportspeople from Rio de Janeiro (city)
Gymnasts at the 1987 Pan American Games
Gymnasts at the 1991 Pan American Games
Universiade medalists in gymnastics
Universiade silver medalists for Brazil
Medalists at the 1993 Summer Universiade
Medalists at the 1987 Pan American Games
Medalists at the 1991 Pan American Games
21st-century Brazilian women
20th-century Brazilian women